Yael Averbuch West (born Yael Friedman Averbuch; November 3, 1986) is a former American professional soccer player. She was formerly the executive director of the National Women's Soccer League Players Association and is the current general manager of NJ/NY Gotham FC. A retired professional soccer player, she last played as a defender for Seattle Reign FC in the National Women's Soccer League.

During her career as a center midfielder at the University of North Carolina at Chapel Hill, Averbuch was named national player of the year by both Soccer Buzz and Top Drawer Soccer.  Averbuch was selected in the first round of the 2009 WPS Draft (4th overall) by her home state team, Sky Blue FC. She later played for Kopparbergs/Göteborg FC in the Damallsvenskan and the UEFA Women's Champions League and made a brief stint with WFC Rossiyanka. She is a two-time WPS champion with Sky Blue FC and the Western New York Flash.

Averbuch played for the United States at every level of the youth national teams and represented the United States women's national soccer team from 2007 to 2013.

Early life
Averbuch, who is Jewish, was born in New York City. She is the daughter of Gloria Averbuch and Paul Friedman. Her middle name is her father's last name and her last name is her mother's maiden name. Her first name means a "capra" in Hebrew.

Averbuch grew up in Montclair, New Jersey, where she attended Montclair High School, graduating in 2005. Yael attained High Honor Roll status all four years in high school. She did not play high school soccer, concentrating on club soccer instead. She was named an NSCAA All-American and USYSA All-American as a sophomore, junior and senior. As a junior and senior, she was named Parade All-American.

University of North Carolina

During her career as a center midfielder at the University of North Carolina at Chapel Hill, Averbuch set a record starting 105 consecutive games. She was a two-time captain and was selected first-team All-Performer the Atlantic Coast Conference, one of the most competitive conferences in the country. She helped the Tar Heels win two NCAA Women's College Cup titles in 2006 and 2008. In 2006 and 2007, she earned NSCAA All-America first team status. In 2008, she was named to the NSCAA All-America second team and earned NSCAA Scholar-Athlete of the Year and NCAA VIII Award honors.

As a freshman in 2005, Averbuch started all 25 games. She scored three of her four goals off direct kicks as the team's free kick and corner kick specialist. She was named to the Soccer America and Soccer Buzz first-team freshman All-America teams after notching seven assists and four goals in her first season with the Tar Heels. She was also named the Soccer Buzz Southeast Region Freshman of the Year and was tapped for the All-Southeast Region Second Team and Southeast Region All-Freshman Team. Averbuch was recognized by the ACC as an Academic All-Conference player and as a member of ACC All-Freshmen Team. She was named to the Duke adidas Classic All-Tournament Team as well as the 2005–06 ACC Honor Roll.

In 2006, Averbuch was Carolina's second-leading scorer with 39 points and led the team in game-winning goals with seven. She was named national player of the year by both Soccer Buzz and Top Drawer Soccer and was a finalist for both the Missouri Athletic Club Hermann Trophy and the Honda Soccer Award. She set an NCAA record for fastest goal scored in a game when she scored four seconds into the match at Yale on the direct kick at midfield to start the game.  Averbuch assisted on both goals against UCLA in the NCAA semifinals and was named the ACC's Offensive Player of the Year, Soccer Buzz's Southeast Region player of the year, first-team All-ACC, and All-ACC Academic for a second straight year. She was also named to ESPN The Magazine's women's soccer third-team Academic All-America.

During her junior year in 2007, Averbuch appeared in and started every game for the Tar Heels. She was fourth on the team with 18 points, collected six goals and six assists for the season, and led the team in shots taken with 88. She was named to the ESPN The Magazine/College Sports Information Directors of America Academic All-District Team and was a second-team ESPN The Magazine All-America selection. She was named ACC's Scholar-Athlete of the Year for women's soccer and was an All-ACC Academic Team selection, first-team All-ACC and All-ACC Tournament selection. She was also a finalist for Soccer Buzz Player of the Year and a MAC Hermann Trophy semifinalist. She made three first-team All-America Teams as named by the NSCAA coaches, Soccer America and Soccer Buzz and was an Umbro/Soccer News Net Player of the Year Award finalist. Averbuch was also a Soccer Buzz and NSCAA first-team All-Southeast Region selection as well as Jewish Sports Review All America.

Club career

New Jersey Lady Stallions
Averbuch played for the New Jersey Lady Stallions in the W-League from 2002 to 2004. At just 14 years of age, she became the youngest player at that time to appear in the W-League.

Sky Blue FC 
Averbuch was selected in the first round of the 2009 WPS Draft (4th overall) by her home state team, Sky Blue FC. During the 2009 season, she started 14 of 18 games and assisted Keeley Dowling's game-winning goal in the WPS Semifinal against the Saint Louis Athletica. The team went on to beat the Los Angeles Sol 1–0 to clinch the 2009 WPS Championship.

In 2010, Averbuch returned to Sky Blue, playing in 23 games, starting 19 and scoring one goal.

Western New York Flash 
In 2011, Averbuch signed with the Western New York Flash. She made 14 appearances with eight starts, playing a total of 751 minutes, helping her team win the 2011 WPS Championship in penalties by scoring the winning penalty kick against the Philadelphia Independence.

WFC Rossiyanka
After the end of the 2011 WPS season and suspension of the league, Averbuch headed to Moscow, Russia for a month to join WFC Rossiyanka for the quarterfinal of the UEFA Champions League. She, along with Kia McNeill and Leigh Ann Robinson, were brought in by the coach to help strengthen the team as it prepared to face Germany's 1. FFC Turbine Potsdam in the UEFA Women's Champions League. Averbuch made two appearances for the team.

Kopparbergs/Göteborg FC
In 2012, Averbuch signed with Kopparbergs/Göteborg FC in Sweden. She made 16 appearances and scored 7 goals across all competitions for Göteborg in 2012. Kopparbergs/Göteborg FC won the 2012 Svenska Cupen by defeating Tyresö FF. Averbuch returned to Göteborg in 2013, where she won the 2013 Svenska Supercupen.

Washington Spirit, 2014
Averbuch was acquired by the Washington Spirit in the National Women's Soccer League ahead of the 2014 NWSL season, she was an allocated player by U.S. Soccer. She appeared in 23 games for Washington as they qualified for the NWSL playoffs for the first time.

Loan to Apollon
Averbuch went on loan to Apollon following the 2014 NWSL season.

FC Kansas City, 2015–2017
Averbuch became a free agent in the NWSL after losing her allocation following the 2014 season. On November 7, 2014 she signed with FC Kansas City. Averbuch made 20 appearances for the club and scored 2 goals. FC Kansas City won the NWSL championship in 2015.

She returned to FCKC for the 2016 NWSL season, she scored 3 goals in 20 games, but FC Kansas City finished in 6th place a failed to qualify for the play-offs.

In 2017, Averbuch played in 23 games and scored 1 goal, FCKC missed the playoffs for the second straight season. After the 2017 NWSL season concluded FC Kansas City ceased operations. Utah Royals FC entered the league and all FCKC player contracts were transferred over to the new franchise. At the 2018 NWSL College Draft Averbuch was traded to the Seattle Reign in exchange for Diana Matheson, reuniting her with former FC Kansas City head coach Vlatko Andonovski.

Averbuch was instrumental in the creation of the National Women's Soccer League Players Association in May 2017. She served as president and the NWSLPA was officially recognized as the exclusive bargaining representative of NWSL Players in November 2018.

Seattle Reign, 2018
Averbuch was only able to play in one game for the Reign in 2018 as she battled ulcerative colitis. She announced prior to the 2019 NWSL season that she was suspending her playing career due to this illness. Averbuch would remain involved with the NWSLPA as she was named Executive Director for 2019.

International career
Averbuch played for the United States at every level of the youth national teams, starting with the U-16 women's national team in 2002 and U-17 team in 2003 before joining the U-19 team later in 2003. She finished her U-19 career with 15 caps and two goals and was a member of the U.S. team that finished third at the 2004 FIFA U-19 Women's World Cup in Thailand, where she played in two matches. She played for the U.S. U-23s in 2008, captaining the team to a Nordic Cup title in Sweden.

Averbuch earned her first two senior team caps in 2007, coming off the bench in two matches at the Four Nations Tournament in China, playing against England (on January 28, 2007) and China. In 2009, she was called upon to start at outside midfield against Germany in the USA's 1–0 victory in October in Augsburg, her only match of the year. In 2010, she played in 10 matches while starting five and scoring one goal.

Averbuch's first goal for the United States women's national soccer team occurred during a 2010 CONCACAF Women's Gold Cup qualifier against Costa Rica on November 1, 2010, in Cancun, Mexico. She played in three matches during the Women's World Cup qualifying matches, starting two.

Managerial career

NJ/NY Gotham FC, 2021–
Following the firing of general manager Alyse LaHue on July 9, 2021, NJ/NY Gotham FC of the National Women's Soccer League named Averbuch as the club's interim general manager on August 3, 2021. On December 7, 2021, Gotham FC made her appointment permanent. Averbuch has since overseen the tenure of coach Scott Parkinson, starting with his hiring on August 31, 2021, and the mutual termination of his contract on August 11, 2022.

Journalism career
Averbuch has written for The New York Times and Our Game Magazine. She now writes her own blog.

Personal life
Averbuch's hometown is Montclair, New Jersey. Her younger sister, Shira, was a midfielder for Stanford University and represented the Team USA in July 2013 in the 19th Maccabiah Games in Israel and is a current employee of Soccer United Marketing.

In 2016 Averbuch founded Techne Futbol, a soccer training app which provides a personal training program for soccer players.

On April 27, 2019 Averbuch married former Davidson College midfielder, Aaron West, in a ceremony in North Carolina.  Their daughter, Aria Adrienne West, was born on September 29, 2020.

Career statistics 

Scores and results list the United States' goal tally first.

Honors and awards
 Set an NCAA record for the fastest goal scored in a game when she scored four seconds into the match at Yale in 2006 on a shot taken directly after the kickoff touch. (video)
 Averbuch, who is Jewish, was named a first-team All-American on the Jewish Sports Reviews 2006 Women's College Division I All-America Soccer Team.
 She was also honored in the National Jewish Sports Hall of Fame and Museum on April 29, 2007.
 ACC (Atlantic Coast Conference) Scholar-Athlete of the Year for women's soccer, 2007 & 2008.
 Was one of three finalists for the MAC Hermann Trophy award in 2006 for top college player in the country.
 Received the NCAA VIII award, given to 8 seniors nationwide for athletic/academic/community achievements.
 Retired her UNC college jersey number in Spring, 2009.University of North CarolinaNCAA Division I Women's Soccer Championship: 2006, 2008Kopparbergs/Göteborg FCSvenska Cupen: 2012
Svenska Supercupen: 2013FC Kansas CityNWSL Championship: 2015United States'
Algarve Cup: 2010, 2011, 2013

See also

List of select Jewish football (association; soccer) players
 All-time Sky Blue FC roster
 List of recipients of Today's Top 10 Award
 Fastest goals in association football
 List of University of North Carolina at Chapel Hill alumni

References

External links

 
 US Soccer player profile 
 North Carolina player profile
 Western New York Flash player profile
 Kopparbergs/Göteborg FC player profile
 Yael Averbuch - Visiting Pro at Berkshire Soccer Academy for Girls
 Video of Yael Averbuch fastest goal in NCAA history
 Video of Yael Averbuch juggling
 Video of Yael Averbuch scoring a goal in WPS game
 
 

1986 births
Living people
American women's soccer players
Damallsvenskan players
BK Häcken FF players
North Carolina Tar Heels women's soccer players
NJ/NY Gotham FC players
USL W-League (1995–2015) players
Western New York Flash players
Expatriate footballers in Sweden
Expatriate women's footballers in Russia
WFC Rossiyanka players
Montclair High School (New Jersey) alumni
Parade High School All-Americans (girls' soccer)
People from Montclair, New Jersey
Soccer players from New York City
Soccer players from New Jersey
Sportspeople from Essex County, New Jersey
Jewish American sportspeople
Jewish footballers
Apollon Ladies F.C. players
Women's association football midfielders
Washington Spirit players
FC Kansas City players
United States women's international soccer players
National Women's Soccer League players
New Jersey Wildcats players
OL Reign players
21st-century American Jews
21st-century American women
Women's Professional Soccer players
NJ/NY Gotham FC non-playing staff
National Women's Soccer League executives